Guston may refer to:

Places
Guston, Kent, a village in Kent, England
Guston, Kentucky, an unincorporated community in Meade County

People
Philip Guston (1913–1980), Canadian American artist of Ukrainian descent

See also
Gustin (disambiguation)